Arrangements is the fourth studio album by Canadian post-punk band Preoccupations. The album was released through Flemish Eye in Canada and self released in the rest of the world on September 9, 2022. The album gap of four-and-a-half years was the longest in the band's career.

Track listing

Critical reception 

Arrangements received positive reviews. At Metacritic, which assigns a normalized rating out of 100 to reviews from mainstream publications, the album received an average score of 72, based on four reviews, indicating "general favorable reviews". Writing for Beats Per Minute, John Amen gave the album a rating of 77% and commented that "...what distinguishes Preoccupations from many of their postpunk peers is not so much a distinct take on the usual sources – Joy Division, Bauhaus, The Cure, et al – but a more subtle and career-long affinity with such bands as Sonic Youth, Swans, and Sunn O))). That is, Preoccupations’ brand of postpunk is denser, grittier, and more panoramic than the versions produced by many of their contemporaries."

References

External links 
Arrangements on Bandcamp

2022 albums
Flemish Eye albums
Jagjaguwar albums
Preoccupations albums
Post-punk albums by Canadian artists
Albums about climate change